Gurley is an unincorporated community in East Feliciana Parish, Louisiana, United States, on Louisiana Highway 963. Gurley is located ten miles from the state of Mississippi.

Education
Gurley is served by the East Feliciana Parish School Board headquartered in Clinton.

Historical significance
Gurley is the location of Oakland Plantation House, a site listed on the National Register of Historic Places.

Unincorporated communities in East Feliciana Parish, Louisiana
Unincorporated communities in Louisiana